Im Tal der wilden Rosen is a German television series. It aired 13 episodes on ZDF from January 29, 2006 to November 23, 2008.

The entire series is available on DVD in PAL format in German.

Episodes

See also
List of German television series

References

External links
 

2005 German television series debuts
2008 German television series endings
German-language television shows
ZDF original programming